Velmpeta is a popular commercial area in the city of Visakhapatnam in the Indian state of Andhra Pradesh.The area, which falls under the local administrative limits of Greater Visakhapatnam Municipal Corporation, is about 4 km from the Dwaraka bus station.

Velampeta is one of the old settlements in Visakhapatnam city. In the early 1970s it was a central hub of commercial activity for the city. This district has a BSNL telephone exchange.

Transport
APSRTC routes

References

Neighbourhoods in Visakhapatnam